Green Pond is an unincorporated community in Colleton County, in the U.S. state of South Carolina.

History
The community was named for a nearby pool of water abundant with algae, according to local history.

See also
Raid on Combahee Ferry

References

Unincorporated communities in Spartanburg County, South Carolina
Unincorporated communities in South Carolina